Deudorix philippinensis is a butterfly of the family Lycaenidae first described by Heinz G. Schroeder, Colin G. Treadaway and Hisakazu Hayashi in 1981. It is endemic to the Philippines where it is found on the islands of Luzon, Marinduque, Masbate, Mindoro, Panay, Negros, Sibuyan and Mindanao.

Its forewing length is 18–25 mm. The female has two forms, with orange or dark brown on the upperside.

References

 , 1981: Zur Kentnis Philippinischer Lycaenidae (Lep.). Entomologische Zeitschrift, 24: 270-272.
, 1995. Checklist of the butterflies of the Philippine Islands (Lepidoptera: Rhopalocera) Nachrichten des Entomologischen Vereins Apollo Suppl. 14: 7-118.

, 2012. Revised checklist of the butterflies of the Philippine Islands (Lepidoptera: Rhopalocera) Nachrichten des Entomologischen Vereins Apollo Suppl. 20: 1-64.

Butterflies described in 1981
Deudorigini
Deudorix